Lavans-lès-Saint-Claude (literally Lavans near Saint-Claude) is a commune in the Jura department in Bourgogne-Franche-Comté in eastern France. On 1 January 2016, the former commune of Ponthoux was merged into Lavans-lès-Saint-Claude. On 1 January 2019, the former commune of Pratz was merged into Lavans-lès-Saint-Claude.

Population

Sport
Lavans-lès-Saint-Claude is the home of Championnat de France Amateurs club, Jura Sud Lavans.

Personalities
 Antide Janvier (1751–1835), clockmaker, was born at Briva (today Brive), a hamlet within the commune.

See also
Communes of the Jura department

References

Communes of Jura (department)